The .500/450 -inch Magnum Black Powder Express, is a centerfire rifle cartridge developed in Britain.

Development
The .500/450 Magnum BPE was created by necking down the .500 Black Powder Express to .45-inches.

For some time after the turn of the century, the .500/450 Magnum BPE was loaded with cordite to become the .500/450 Magnum Nitro for Black, the same cartridge loaded with mild loadings of cordite, carefully balanced through trial to replicate the ballistics of the Black powder version.

Dimenssions

Nitro Express loadings
In 1898 John Rigby & Company loaded the .450 Nitro Express cartridge with cordite to create the .450 Nitro Express, the first Nitro Express cartridge. Not to be left behind Holland and Holland followed suit, loading the .500/450 Magnum BPE with cordite to create the .500/450 Nitro Express.

Use
The .500/450 Magnum BPE was a popular cartridge for deer and similarly sized game, particularly in Africa. Available until World War II, the round has long since ceased to be offered commercially.

See also
Express (weaponry)
List of rifle cartridges
11 mm caliber

References

Footnotes

Bibliography
 Barnes, Frank C, Cartridges of the World, ed 13, Gun Digest Books, Iola, 2012, .
 Wieland, Terry, Nitro Express: The Big Bang of the Big Bang, retrieved 20 Jun 16.

External links

 cartridgecollector.net, .500/450 Drawn Black Powder Express, retrieved 21 Jun 16.

Pistol and rifle cartridges
British firearm cartridges